Tahua is a Duff Islands archipelago, located in the Temotu Province of the Solomon Islands in the Pacific Ocean. The estimated terrain elevation above sea level is some 23 metres. The island is inhabited.

History
The artificial island of Tahua already existed when Portuguese explorer Pedro Fernández de Quirós discovered the Duff Islands on 8 April 1606. In the 1930s, Tahua Island measured only 100 by 150 metres, and walls divided the single village there. During the 1950s, the entire Duff Islands population lived on Tahua. The local people physically resemble Melanesians and speak a language called Pileni, that belongs to the Samoic branch of the Polynesian languages. The way of life is traditional by subsistence farming and fishing.

References

External links
 Article on Duff islands
 The Archaeology of Taumako: A Polynesian Outlier in the Eastern Solomon Islands

Islands of the Solomon Islands
Polynesian outliers